Beyblade Burst Surge, known in Japan as Beyblade Burst Sparking or , is a 2020 original net animation series and the fifth season of Beyblade Burst. The series was produced by ADK Emotions and animated by OLM, and it began streaming in Japan on the CoroCoro and Takara Tomy YouTube channels on April 3, 2020. On September 15, 2020, it was announced that the season would receive television broadcasting on Tokyo MX on October 5, 2020. An English dub of the anime premiered on Disney XD in the United States on February 20, 2021. It aired in India from November 24, 2022 to December 9, 2022 on Disney Channel. The opening theme is "Sparking Revolution" while the ending theme is an instrumental version of "Sparking Revolution". The English opening theme is "We Got the Spin" by Konrad OldMoney while the ending theme is an instrumental of "We Got the Spin".


Episode list

References

Burst Season 5
2020 anime ONAs
2021 anime ONAs
2020 Japanese television seasons
2021 Japanese television seasons